Vladan Slijepčević (30 October 1930 – 13 September 1989) was a Serbian and Yugoslavian film director and screenwriter. He directed more than 50 films between 1952 and 1989. His 1966 film The Climber was entered into the 5th Moscow International Film Festival where it won a Silver Prize.

Selected filmography
 Where to After the Rain? (1967)
 The Climber (1966)
 The Real State of Affairs (1964)
 Three-Hearts Locket (1962)
 For Youth (1953)

References

External links

1930 births
1989 deaths
Serbian film directors
Film people from Skopje